Allocasuarina decussata, commonly known as karri oak or karri she-oak, is a medium-sized tree, or more rarely a shrub, that is endemic to the south west of Western Australia. It is an understory tree in karri forest but also occurs as a stunted shrub in places like Bluff Knoll in the Stirling Range.

Description
As with other members of the family Casuarinaceae, the foliage consists of wiry green branchlets called cladodes with rings of minute leaf scales. Separate male and female flowers form on the same individual plant. The fruiting structure is a woody cone, shaped like a short cylinder with its diameter roughly equal to or slightly greater than its length. It often grows in association with Acacia pentadenia and Asplenium aethiopicum often grows as an epiphyte on its branches.

Taxonomy
This species was first formally described in 1873 by George Bentham Flora Australiensis from specimens collected by James Drummond near Cape Riche, Western Australia. Bentham gave it the name Casuarina decussata. In 1982, Lawrie Johnson moved it to its current genus Allocasuarina in his revision of the she-oaks. It is closely related to A. torulosa of New South Wales and Queensland.
 The specific epithet (decussata) is a Latin word meaning "like the letter X" or "the Roman numeral ten".

Distribution and habitat
Karri oak is restricted to the southwest of Western Australia in the Esperance Plains, Jarrah Forest and Warren biogeographical regions. It grows on loam in the karri forest but also found on much poorer soils in the Stirling Range.

Cultivation and uses
Karri oak is not known in cultivation and there is only limited availability of timber because most trees are in national parks but its pale reddish-brown heartwood has distinctive rays that potentially make it useful as a craft wood.

References

Fagales of Australia
decussata
Trees of Australia
Plants described in 1873
Endemic flora of Southwest Australia